Flight 36 may refer to:

Aeroflot Flight 36 (1960), crashed on 17 August 1960
Aeroflot Flight 36 (1976), crashed on 17 December 1976

0036